is a species of flowering plant in the family Ericaceae that is endemic to the Bonin Islands, Tōkyō Metropolis, Japan.

Taxonomy
The species was first described by Japanese botanist Takenoshin Nakai in 1926. The specific epithet relates to the type locality in the Bonin (or Munin) Islands.

Description
After flowering, from January to April, it produces small spherical fruits  in diameter that turn black as they ripen.

Conservation status
Vaccinium boninense is classed as Vulnerable on the Ministry of the Environment Red List.

See also

 Ogasawara subtropical moist forests
 Ogasawara National Park

References

boninense
Flora of the Bonin Islands
Endemic flora of Japan
Species described in 1926
Taxa named by Takenoshin Nakai